Futbol+ is an Azerbaijani national daily sport newspaper owned by Vugar Mammadov. The newspaper focuses primarily on football, in particular the day-to-day activities of Azerbaijan Premier League clubs. It has one of the highest in Azerbaijan for a daily newspaper, and quarter than half of sports readership.

History
Futbol+ was founded on 21 October, 1997 by Vugar Mammadov. In 2012, the club celebrated its 15th year since its launch. In 2010s, the newspaper saw falling profits, but did not change its policies or the nature of the content it carried.

References

1997 establishments in Azerbaijan
Newspapers established in 1997
Futbol+
Futbol+
Sports newspapers
Sports mass media in Azerbaijan
Mass media in Baku